Ziani is a surname. Notable people with the surname include:

 Hocine Ziani (born 1953), Algerian painter
 Kamal Ziani (born 1972), Spanish long-distance runner
 Karim Ziani (born 1982), Algerian footballer
 Marc'Antonio Ziani (c. 1653–1715), Italian composer
 Mohamed Benomar Ziani (born 1938), Moroccan singer
 Pietro Ziani (died 1230), Doge of Venice
 Pietro Andrea Ziani (1616–1684), Italian composer 
 Salima Ziani (born 1994), Moroccan singer and activist
 Samir Ziani (born 1990), French boxer
 Sebastiano Ziani (died 1178), Doge of Venice
 Stéphane Ziani (born 1971), French footballer

Italian-language surnames